Kanell is a surname. Notable people with the surname include:

Billie G. Kanell (1931–1951), American Korean War veteran
Danny Kanell (born 1973), American football player

See also
Danell